Point de Bute is an unincorporated community in Westmorland County, New Brunswick, Canada.

The local service district of Pointe de Bute takes its name from the community but uses a different spelling.

History

The Acadian Pierre Buhot settled here in the late 1600s, and the original name was Pont à Buhot which evolved, via Pont à Buot to the current name. Opposite his house was a bridge over the Missaguash River, leading to the Tantramar Marsh. It was near the outlet of a stream, Rivière à l'Ours and a redoubt, which was the first point of attack by Monckton's army in 1755 as it advanced from Fort Lawrence to cross the Missaguash river on the way to attack Fort Beausejour.

Notable people

Point de Bute is the birthplace of the British Columbian transportation pioneer Stephen Tingley, 
birth place of World War I flying ace Albert Desbrisay Carter, and the scientist Edwin Colpitts.
 home of Thomas Dixson

See also
List of communities in New Brunswick

References

Communities in Westmorland County, New Brunswick
Local service districts of Westmorland County, New Brunswick